The Women's 70 kg competition at the 2021 World Judo Championships was held on 10 June 2021.

Results

Finals

Repechage

Pool A

Pool B

Pool C

Pool D

Prize money
The sums listed bring the total prizes awarded to 57,000€ for the individual event.

References

External links
 
 Weight class draw and results on:  JudoBase.org, live.ijf.org

W70
World Judo Championships Women's Middleweight
World W70